David Eigenberg (born May 17, 1964) is an American actor. He is known for his roles as Steve Brady on the HBO series Sex and the City and its revival series And Just Like That... and as Lieutenant Christopher Herrmann on NBC's Chicago Fire.

Early life and education
Eigenberg was born in Manhasset, New York, on Long Island, and grew up in Naperville, Illinois, the only boy in a family of six children. He has an older sister named Helen and a younger sister named Betsy. His mother, Beverly, owned pre-schools, and his father, Harry, was a certified public accountant. Eigenberg's father was Jewish and his mother was Episcopalian; he was raised in his mother's faith. 

After graduating from high school in 1982, Eigenberg enlisted in the United States Marine Corps Reserve, serving for three years (1982–1986), and was honorably discharged at the rank of Lance Corporal.

Career
Eigenberg's first recurring role was on Homicide: Life on the Street, where he portrayed a copycat sniper, before acting in The Practice. He voiced the role of Nermal in Garfield: The Movie. He made an appearance on an episode of ER during the show's final season, and made an appearance in the movie Daybreak. He appeared in the American TV show The King of Queens, in the episode entitled "Flash Photography", where he portrayed the groom of Carrie's annoying friend.

In 2002, Eigenberg starred as the short-lived character Officer Ross in the Season 3 episode of Third Watch, entitled "Superheroes: Part 1". In July 2004, he appeared in the sci-fi series The 4400. He appeared as Carl Morrissey in part two of the pilot, entitled "The New and Improved Carl Morrissey". Eigenberg appeared as a suspect in the sixth episode of the TV series Raines, entitled "Inner Child", which first aired on April 20, 2007.

He appeared in an episode of Ghost Whisperer, alongside Jennifer Love Hewitt, and in CBS's NCIS as Ted Bankston, a former NSA analyst who was suspected of mishandling classified information, which was eventually proven to be true. His character had kidnapped Michelle Lee's (Liza Lapira) daughter/sister, Amanda, and had forced her to work for him; he was killed off during a stand-off between himself, Lee, and Leroy Jethro Gibbs (Mark Harmon) in the Season 6 episode, "Dagger". Eigenberg had a recurring role in the HBO series Sex and the City as Steve Brady, Miranda Hobbes' on-and-off-again boyfriend and eventual husband, a role he later reprised in the revival series And Just Like That…. In 2009 he appeared in Season 6 episode 13 of Cold Case titled "Breaking News". He played the 1988 version of Nathan Kravet.

In 2010, he appeared as Agent Russell Goldman in the Season 5 episode of Criminal Minds, entitled "Parasite". In March 2011, he appeared in Season 3 of Castle, in the episode "One Life to Lose", as Peter Connelly. He appeared in the May 16, 2012 episode of Law & Order: Special Victims Unit, entitled "Strange Beauty". In the fall of 2012, Eigenberg joined the cast of NBC's Chicago Fire as Senior Firefighter/Lieutenant Christopher Herrmann.

Stage Career
Eigenberg first appeared on Broadway in the original production of John Guare's Six Degrees of Separation as the "Hustler" from 1990 to 1992. He returned from 2003 to 2004 as "Toddy Koovitz" in the original Broadway production of Richard Greenberg's Tony award winning play Take Me Out.

Personal life
Eigenberg and his wife Chrysti (née Kotik) have a son, Louie Steven (born January 19, 2009) and a daughter, Myrna Belle (born January 31, 2014). In 2021, it was reported that Eigenberg had been diagnosed with hearing loss.

Filmography

Film

Television

References

External links

 
 

1964 births
Living people
Episcopalians from New York (state)
American people of Jewish descent
American male film actors
American male television actors
American male voice actors
Male actors from Naperville, Illinois
Male actors from New York (state)
People from Long Island
United States Marines
People from Manhasset, New York
20th-century American male actors
21st-century American male actors